Sina Zamehran (born 10 March 1997) is an Iranian footballer who plays as a midfielder who currently plays for Iranian club Saipa F.C. in the League1.

Club career
Padideh Khorasan FC

He started his career in 2016 with Padideh Mashhad and played in this team until 2019

Foolad
In 2020, he joined the football team of Foolad Khoristan and is active in this team 

Sanat Naft Abadan F.C  

Foolad In 2021, he joined the football team of  Sanat Naft Abadan F.C and is active in this team

External links 

Sina Zamehran  at Soccerway 

Sina Zamehran on instagram

Sina Zamehran at PersianLeague.com 

Sina Zamehran at WorldFootball.net

References

Living people
1997 births
Association football midfielders
Iranian footballers
Shahr Khodro F.C. players
Iran youth international footballers
Footballers at the 2018 Asian Games
Sportspeople from Mashhad
Asian Games competitors for Iran